Mahmood Lodhi (born 1961) is a Pakistani chess player. He was awarded the title International Master by FIDE in 1987. He is the reigning national champion and has won the national chess championship of his country a record 15 times. Lodhi won the Asian Senior Chess Championship in the 50+ category in 2015 and 2017.

References

External links 
 
 Mahmood Lodhi chess games at 365Chess.com
 

1961 births
Living people
Chess International Masters
Pakistani chess players
People from Gujranwala